Aleksandr Vasilyevich Samsonov (born 16 July 1953) is a Russian former swimmer. He competed at the 1972 Summer Olympics in the 400 m, 1500 m and 4 × 200 m freestyle. He won a bronze medal in the relay, in which he swam for the Soviet team in the preliminary round, but failed to reach the finals in other events.

Between 1970 and 1975 he won six medals at European and world championships, including four medals at the 1974 European Aquatics Championships.

References

1953 births
Living people
Russian male freestyle swimmers
Olympic swimmers of the Soviet Union
Swimmers at the 1972 Summer Olympics
Soviet male freestyle swimmers
World Aquatics Championships medalists in swimming
European Aquatics Championships medalists in swimming
Medalists at the 1972 Summer Olympics
Olympic bronze medalists for the Soviet Union
Universiade medalists in swimming
Universiade silver medalists for the Soviet Union
Medalists at the 1973 Summer Universiade